SWC may refer to:

Education
 Sir Winston Churchill Secondary School (disambiguation)
 Sir Winston Churchill High School
 Sir Winston Churchill Collegiate & Vocational Institute
 Sisseton Wahpeton College
 Southwestern College (disambiguation)

Sport
 South West Conference, a High School Sports Conference in southern Connecticut
 Southwest Conference, a former College Sports Conference
 Southwestern Conference (Ohio), a High School Sports Conference in northern Ohio
 Speedway World Cup

Other uses
 Sarah Wayne Callies, American actress
 Semiwadcutter, a common shape of ammunition
 Single Wire Controller–area network
 Simon Wiesenthal Center
 Solar Wind Composition Experiment
 Space Warfare Center of the United States military
 Republic of Korea Army Special Warfare Command
 Star Wars Celebration
 Star Wars Combine, an online game
 Steering Wheel Controls (often referring to audio controls)
 Stillwater Mining Company, which trades on the New York Stock Exchange under symbol SWC
 Storage World Conference
 Strangers with Candy, television series
 Siemens Westinghouse Competition
 Adobe SWC file, archive file for Adobe Flex components
The Southwest Chief, a daily passenger train operated by Amtrak between Chicago, Illinois and Los Angeles, California.
 Stawell Airport, IATA airport code "SWC"